Gustav Nachtigal (born 23 February 1834 – 20 April 1885) was a German military surgeon and explorer of Central and West Africa. He is further known as the German Empire's consul-general for Tunisia and Commissioner for West Africa. His mission as commissioner resulted in Togoland and Kamerun becoming the first colonies of a German colonial empire. The Gustav-Nachtigal-Medal, awarded by the Berlin Geographical Society, is named after him.

Life and travels
Gustav Nachtigal, the son of a Lutheran pastor, was born at Eichstedt in the Prussian province of Saxony-Anhalt. His father died of Phthisis pulmonum in 1839. After medical studies at the universities of Halle, Würzburg and Greifswald, he practised for several years as a military surgeon. He worked in Cologne, Germany. Nachtigal contracted a lung disease and relocated to Annaba in Algeria in October, 1862. He travelled to Tunis in 1863, where he studied Arabic, and took part as surgeon in several expeditions into Central Africa between 1869 and 1875.

He returned to Germany and met Friedrich Gerhard Rohlfs. Rohlfs asked him to go to the Bornu Empire. He then would be commissioned by King Wilhelm I of Prussia to carry gifts to Umar of Borno, sheik of the Bornu Empire, in acknowledgment of kindness shown to German travellers, such as Heinrich Barth. Nachtigal set out in 1869 from Ottoman Tripoli and accomplished his mission after a two years' journey. During this period, he visited Tibesti and Borku, regions of the central Sahara not previously known to Europeans. He travelled with eight camels and six men.

From Bornu he travelled to Baguirmi, an independent state to the southeast of Bornu. From there, he proceeded to Wadai (a powerful Muslim kingdom to the northeast of Baguirmi) and to Kordofan (a former province of central Sudan). Nachtigal finally emerged from his journey through the Sahel at Khartoum (then the centre of Turkish-Egyptian Sudan) in the winter of 1874, after having been given up as lost. His journey, described in his Sahara and Sudan, earned him a reputation as a discoverer. In 1882, he was awarded the Royal Geographical Society's Founder's Medal.

After the establishment of a French protectorate over Tunisia, Nachtigal was sent as consul-general for the German Empire and remained there until 1884. Thereafter, he was appointed by Chancellor Otto von Bismarck as special commissioner for West Africa. Local German business interests in that region began advocating for protection by the German Empire, after they had acquired huge properties in West Africa. Nachtigal’s task was to establish a claim for Germany, before the British could advance their own interests — and Togoland and Kamerun became Germany’s first colonial possessions. In 1888 Nachtigal’s remains were exhumed and reburied in a ceremonial grave in Duala in front of the Kamerun colonial government building.

Legacy

Along with Heinrich Barth, Nachtigal has been regarded as the other important German explorer of Africa. Like Barth, Nachtigal was primarily interested in ethnography, and additionally in tropical medicine. His works stand out because of their wealth of details and because of his unbiased views of Africans. In contrast to most contemporary explorers, Nachtigal did not regard Africans as inferior to Europeans, as is reflected in his descriptions and choice of words.

He had witnessed slave hunts performed by African rulers and the cruelties inflicted by them upon other Africans. The horror that he felt about these atrocities made him enter colonial endeavours, because he believed that European domination of the African continent might stop slave-hunting and slave ownership.

Works
Original Publication
Saharâ und Sûdân. 2 volumes, Berlin 1879-81, volume 3 published by E. Groddeck, Leipzig 1889.

English Translation
Sahara and Sudan. volume I: Fezzan and Tibesti; volume II: Kawar, Bornu, Kanem, Borku, Ennedi; volume III: The Chad Basin and Bagirmi; volume IV: Wadai and Darfur. Translated from the original German with an Introduction and Notes by Allan G. B. Fisher and H. J. Fisher. London — New York — Berkeley - 1971-1987.

See also
Mimi of Nachtigal, an extinct language of Chad

References

Footnotes

Sources

Gustav Nachtigal — ein deutscher Forscher und Afrika (Manuscript of speech held at the Togo Exhibition at Düsseldorf 1986). Peter Kremer. 
Die Forschungsreisenden, Cornelius Trebbin & Peter Kremer, Die Tuareg. Düsseldorf 1985.

External links

 Sahara and Sudan By Gustav Nachtigal, Allan George Barnard Fisher, Humphrey J. Fisher
 

1834 births
1885 deaths
People from Stendal (district)
People from the Province of Saxony
German explorers of Africa
Explorers of Africa
German West Africa
People of former German colonies
German colonial people in Kamerun
Martin Luther University of Halle-Wittenberg alumni
University of Würzburg alumni
University of Greifswald alumni
German expatriates in Algeria
German expatriates in Tunisia
People who died at sea